"Africa" is a cover version of Toto's popular 1982 song, as performed by American rock band Weezer. The cover was released as a single on May 29, 2018, and later included on Weezer's self-titled 12th studio album, nicknamed the Teal Album.

Release
In December 2017, Twitter user "@WeezerAfrica," run by 14-year-old Cleveland, Ohio resident Mary Klym, tweeted, "@RiversCuomo it's about time you bless the rains down in Africa." The band released a cover of "Rosanna", a different Toto song, in order to troll Klym and those clamoring for a version of "Africa".

Weezer finally released "Africa" on May 29, 2018. It was the band's first Hot 100 hit since "(If You're Wondering If I Want You To) I Want You To" in 2009. "Africa" reached number 51 on the Hot 100 and peaked at number one on the Billboard Alternative Songs chart in August 2018, becoming the band's first number-one single in that chart since "Pork and Beans" in 2008.
 
A limited edition 7-inch vinyl pressing was released by Weezer in July 2018 and sold exclusively through Urban Outfitters. The pressing was limited to 1,500 copies, with "Africa" as the A-side and "Rosanna" as the B-side. The cover artwork features a background of palm fronds with the tweet that inspired the song in the center of the cover.

Shortly after the song's release, Weezer appeared on Jimmy Kimmel Live! along with keyboardist Steve Porcaro of Toto to promote the single. Toto responded on August 9, 2018, by releasing a cover of Weezer's 2001 single "Hash Pipe", after debuting it in concert a week prior.

Weezer included the cover on their surprise release of the all-covers "Teal Album" in January 2019.

Music video
Weezer released a music video of their "Africa" cover in September 2018, styled as a parody of the video for their earlier single "Undone – The Sweater Song." Stand-ins for the band members perform the song on a soundstage, with "Weird Al" Yankovic replacing singer/guitarist Rivers Cuomo, with his band members replacing Weezer. Yankovic had previously appeared onstage during the band's tour to perform "Africa" with them.

Charts

Weekly charts

Year-end charts

References

2018 singles
Weezer songs